Valdés is a Spanish municipality in the province of Asturias. Its capital is Luarca. It borders the Bay of Biscay on the north, the municipalities of Navia and Villayón on the west, Tineo on the south, Salas on the southeast, and Cudillero on the east. The rivers Esva, Negro and Barayo flow through the area. The national road N-634 is the main road serving the municipality.

The surname "Valdés", widespread throughout Spain and Hispanic America, is believed to have ultimately originated from the town of Valdés.

Politics

Parishes

Notable residents
Álvaro de Albornoz y Liminiana (1879-1954), politician
María Esther García López (b. 1948), poet and writer
Severo Ochoa de Albornoz (1905-1993), biochemist, Nobel Prize for Physiology or Medicine in 1959.
Gil Parrondo y Rico (1921-2016), set decorator
Margarita Salas Folgueras (1938-2019), scientist

See also
Iglesia de San Miguel Arcángel (Trevías)

References

External links

Townhall website 
Federación Asturiana de Concejos (Asturian Federation of Municipalities) 
Vivasturias (tourism page) 
Images of Valdés

Municipalities in Asturias